The Military Railway Service was created in the 1920s as a reserve force for the Quartermaster Division of the United States Army. It had existed twice before: first as the United States Military Railroad during the American Civil War, and later by the United States Railroad Administration during World War I. In the original documentation for the service, all Class I railroad companies were to create a battalion for the war effort.  In doing so, 11 Grand Divisions were formed and 46 operating battalions were assigned; however, five were never activated.

History
Each railway operating battalion was established with four companies. The headquarters company was used for signaling, dispatching, and supplying their section of the railway. The A company was set up to handle the maintenance of tracks themselves, the B company handled the maintenance of the rolling stock through the stations, and the C company was set up with roughly 50 men to operate the trains in their area.  As for the Grand Division it was established with multiple operating battalions and then a shop battalion and a base depot company. The shop battalion was only to work on the engines themselves.  During the war, there were two types of shop battalions.  The main type at the start was the steam engine battalion; however there were a few diesel shop battalions.

The 1st and 2nd Military Railway Service (MRS) controlled supply by rail in the European Theater of Operations (ETO).  The 1st was assigned to the Mediterranean with Italy, North Africa, and Southern France as its main areas of operations.  The 2nd was assigned to Northern France and Germany.  By 1942, the first units started to be shipped out.  Besides units for the Persian Gulf Command and North Africa, the 761st Operating for England and for Alaska the 770th Operating was shipped out.  Another MRS was established to handle the supplies sent to Russia through Iran (Persian Corridor).  The 3rd MRS was set up using the 702nd with the 711th Operating, 730th Operating, 754th Shop, and 762nd Diesel Shop battalions as its core units.  Initial Command was under the 702nd Grand Division but by April 1944 it was replaced by the 3rd MRS.  The 702nd and initial 3rd MRS commander was Colonel Paul F. Yount, but in May 1944 he was sent east to assist the China Burma India Theater and Colonel Frank S. Besson Jr. was tasked to take over the 3rd MRS.

The 1st MRS was led by Brig General Carl R. Gray Jr., an executive from the Chicago, St. Paul, Minneapolis & Omaha Railroad, who was the son of Carl R. Gray Sr., the former president of multiple railways in the United States, including the Union Pacific.  The battalions under his command included the 701st, 703rd, 704th, 713th, 715th, 719th, 727th, 753rd, 759th, and the 760th.

List of Railway Grand Divisions and their sponsors

List of Railway Operating Battalions

List of Railway Shop Battalions

Note: The 760th and 762d were RSB (Diesel); all others were RSB (Steam).

See also 
 Military railways

References

Military railways
Transportation units and formations of the United States Army